Lee Harding (born 8 June 1983) is an Australian singer from Frankston, Victoria. He is best known for placing third in the third season of Australian Idol in 2005.

Career

Bedrock
Prior to competing in Australian Idol, Harding was a member of a cover band named "Bedrock" who described themselves as a "party band", with a repertoire of hits from the 1960s to the present day. Harding was quoted on his website as saying, "I'd been going to see them since I was 16. I saw them every single week so I knew every song when I joined Bedrock".

2005–2007: Australian Idol and What's Wrong with This Picture?
In 2005, Harding auditioned for the third season of Australian Idol, ultimately placing third. Harding's performances on Australian Idol include:

Immediately following the show, Harding was signed to Sony BMG and released his debut single "Wasabi"/"Eye of the Tiger" in December 2005. The song debuted at number one on the ARIA Charts and was the eighth highest single in 2006.

Harding's debut album What's Wrong with This Picture? was released in February 2006 and peaked at number 3 on the ARIA albums charts. Two further singles followed; "Anything for You" and "Call the Nurse". In July 2007, Harding's contract ceased with Sony BMG, with the record label claiming they had "their line up of priority artists for the year, and he was not one of them."

2007–2018: Projects 
Since 2007, Harding has been involved in a number of short-lived projects, including the group Rock City 2, who released an album in October 2007.
 and the Patience Project who released a single titled "Lipstick Cabaret" in June 2011.
Harding also plays in cover bands at Crown Casino in Melbourne.

2019: The Voice 
In 2019 Harding auditioned for the eighth season of The Voice Australia where he joined team Boy George. He was eliminated in the top 9.

Discography

Albums

Singles

Concerts/Tours

Shannon Noll support act
Lee was support for fellow Idol contestant Shannon Noll on his nationwide tour with mate and fellow Idol contestant Dan England. Harding played venues such as Luna Park Sydney's Big Top.

INXS support act
August 2006, Harding was opening act for rock group INXS with bandmates Bedrock for one night of their tour in Brisbane.

Anything for You Tour
In April 2006, Harding headlined his own tour titled the Anything for You Tour. Before acts included the Sydney-based power-pop group Kid Courageous, rapper Figgkidd, and the indie rock group Town Hall Steps. Harding performed at such venues including Penrith Panthers and Castle Hill RSL Club. The tour covered venues along the east coast of Australia.

All Age Rampage/Pop Punk Tour 2006
In September 2006, Harding began his co-headlining tour with Kid Courageous of small venues across the nation. The tour commenced in Brisbane, then continued to the Gold Coast, Melbourne, Albury and Adelaide. Artists on the tour included Lee Harding and Bedrock, Kid Courageous, 919 (later known as Amber Calling) and Enolas Secret (formerly known as Wishlist). Melbourne band Don't Ask Us supported the tour on the Victorian dates. Due to the arisal of a family issue, the tour was postponed for the NSW shows, which consisted of venues such as Penrith Leagues, the Manning Bar and Dapto Leagues. News was received after the conclusion of the Adelaide show and was confirmed in an official press release by Harding's manager at the time.

Bass in the Grass
Lee attended Bass in the Grass in Darwin in 2006. While on stage he was "hit by a barrage of full water bottles hurled at him from all sides".

References

http://www.news.com.au/heraldsun/story/0,21985,22064138-5012974,00.html

External links
WHO.com Australian Idol blog
Take40 Article

1983 births
Australian Idol participants
Singers from Melbourne
Living people
21st-century Australian singers
21st-century Australian male singers
People from Frankston, Victoria